Circus Capers is a 1930 animated short film made by The Van Beuren Corporation and distributed by Pathé Exchange. The film, which featured the characters Milton & Rita, is part of the early sound cartoon series entitled Aesop's Sound Fables, though it is not based on an Aesop fable.

Released on September 28, 1930, it was one of the last cartoons to feature Milton & Rita before Van Beuren was sued by Disney to their similarity to Mickey and Minnie in 1931.

Plot 

The film begins with a circus parade, with a variety of dancing animals, and a trombone band. Once at the circus, the first slideshow is an obese lady in revealing clothing, which excites the crowd as they dash in after her when she goes into the circus hall. The acts inside the circus are extraordinary, with a horse leaping from a high platform, Milton commanding a pack of lions through the hole between both his hands, and the circus keeper dancing with a lion. However, in the 3rd act, the circus keeper is kicked off the stage by the lion. Milton laughs at him off-stage, until the circus keeper snarls back at him. The next act, involves Milton in a human cannonball. For retaliation for laughing at him, the circus keeper implements more gunpowder than necessary into Milton's cannon. This makes Milton fly out of the circus hall and into the sky. The circus keeper then runs off with Rita into a private wagon. However, Milton falls back into the same wagon as theirs, and discovers Rita kissing the circus-keeper. Saddened and shocked, Milton slowly walks out the wagon, before breaking down. Then, Milton sings Laugh, Clown, Laugh. This makes Rita reject the circus keeper and attempt to take back Milton. She is unsuccessful, as Milton rejects her by blowing a raspberry. Milton then breaks the 4th wall by winking at the camera, and the cartoon ends with the camera zooming into his nose.

Milton & Rita 
The cartoon features Milton and Rita, the main characters in the Aesop shorts made in 1930. Milton looked similar to Mickey and Rita looked similar to Minnie Mouse. However, Milton and Rita were only in a few Sound Fables. As due to their similarity, Van Beuren was sued by Disney in 1931. The outcome of the lawsuit was that Van Beuren agreed to no longer use Milton and Rita in his Sound Fables.

Reception 
Circus Capers was well received by the cinema magazines at that time. The Motion Picture News said that the film was "Enjoyable" and said that the film will be "fine in any spot where comedy is needed". Whilst The Film Daily said that the film was a "Good Aesop Fable" and also said that the mix of funny emotions and dramatic stuff "gets the laughs".

References

External links 
 Circus Capers on YouTube
 Circus Capers on IMDb

1930 short films
1930s American animated films
1930 animated films
American black-and-white films
1930s English-language films
American animated short films
Circus films
Comedy films about clowns
Animated films about mice
Animated films about dogs
Pathé Exchange films